Darrell Richard Stone (born 1968), is a male former athlete who competed for England.

Athletics career
Stone is a three times English national champion after winning the 1993 UK Athletics Championships, 1994 AAA Championships and 1995 AAA Championships.

He represented England in the 30 km walk event, at the 1994 Commonwealth Games in Victoria, British Columbia, Canada. Four years later he represented England in the 20 km walk event, at the 1998 Commonwealth Games in Kuala Lumpur, Malaysia.

References

1968 births
Athletes (track and field) at the 1994 Commonwealth Games
Athletes (track and field) at the 1998 Commonwealth Games
Living people
British male racewalkers
English male racewalkers
Commonwealth Games competitors for England